Betty R. De Boef (born February 19, 1951) is an American politician in the state of Iowa. A Republican, she served in the Iowa House of Representatives for the 96th district from 2001 to 2003 and for the 76th district from 2003 to 2012.

Early life 
De Boef was born in 1951 in Jasper County, Iowa. Her parents were George and Anna Den Besten. She grew up on a farm outside of Prairie City. She graduated from Pella Christian High School and Dordt College. She was a member of the Oskaloosa Christian Women's Club and the Mahaska County Republican Central Committee. She runs a family farm and wood grinding business. She married her husband, Harold De Boef, on February 20, 1971, and the couple have two sons and two daughters.

Political career 
De Boef was first elected to the Iowa House of Representatives for the 96th district in 2001, a position that she held until 2003. She was then elected as the representative for the 76th district between 2003 to 2012. She served on several committees in the legislature: the agriculture committee, the appropriations committee and the environmental protection committee. She was the ranking member of the agriculture and natural resources appropriations subcommittee.

De Boef was re-elected in 2006 with 5,819 votes (54%), defeating Democratic opponent Christopher Hontross.

References

External links
 Representative Betty De Boef official Iowa General Assembly site
 
Profile at Iowa House Republicans

Republican Party members of the Iowa House of Representatives
Living people
1951 births
Women state legislators in Iowa
People from Jasper County, Iowa
People from What Cheer, Iowa
21st-century American women